Ukraine competed at the 2018 Winter Paralympics in Pyeongchang County, Gangwon Province, South Korea, from 9 to 18 March 2018. The country was represented by 22 athletes, and 9 assistants for athletes with visual impairments. Of the six paralympic sports, Ukraine competed in biathlon, skiing and snowboarding.

Medals
Medals by sport

Medals by date

See also
Ukraine at the 2018 Winter Olympics

References

Nations at the 2018 Winter Paralympics
2018
Winter Paralympics